Copa de la Reina is the name of the national single-elimination women's sports competitions in Spain, in honour of Queen Letizia. They include:

 Copa de la Reina de Baloncesto, Spain's women's basketball cup
 Copa de la Reina de Balonmano, Spain's women's handball cup
 Copa de la Reina de Fútbol, Spain's women's football cup
 Copa de la Reina de Futsal, Spain's futsal cup
 Copa de la Reina de Rugby, Spain's rugby union cup
 Copa de la Reina de Hockey Patines, Spain's rink hockey cup
 Copa de la Reina de Hockey Hierba, Spain's field hockey cup
 Copa de la Reina de Waterpolo, Spain's water polo cup